Vinay Tiwari is an Indian politician and a member of the Sixteenth Legislative Assembly of Uttar Pradesh in India. He represents the Gola Gokrannath constituency of Uttar Pradesh and is a member of the Samajwadi Party political party.

Early life and education
Vinay Tiwari was born in Lakhimpur Kheri district. He attended the Public Inter College in Gola Gokaran Nath and is educated till twelfth grade.

Political career
Vinay Tiwari has been a MLA for one term. He represented the Gola Gokrannath constituency and is a member of the Samajwadi Party political party.

He lost his seat in the 2017, again he lost in 2022 Uttar Pradesh Assembly election to Arvind Giri of the Bharatiya Janata Party Again he lost the seat to Aman Giri,  by election held after the demise of Arvind Giri in 2022 .

Posts held

See also

 Gola Gokrannath (Assembly constituency)
 Sixteenth Legislative Assembly of Uttar Pradesh
 Uttar Pradesh Legislative Assembly

References 

Samajwadi Party politicians
Uttar Pradesh MLAs 2012–2017
People from Lakhimpur Kheri district
1969 births
Living people